Alexander Pfänder (7 February 1870, in Iserlohn18 March 1941, in Munich) was a German philosopher who was a member of the Munich phenomenological school.

Biography
Pfänder was born in Iserlohn and spent his entire academic career in Munich, where he was a student of Theodor Lipps and one of the founding members of the Munich circle of phenomenologists. As a professor Pfänder was also influential in conveying and promoting a version of phenomenology that differed from Edmund Husserl's "transcendental" orientation. His early phenomenological analysis of willing (1900) in fact predated Husserl's breakthrough in phenomenology (Logical Investigations, vol. II (1901)). In spite of his talents as a writer and a teacher, Pfänder did not come into prominence as did Heidegger with Being and Time (1927) and has consequently been overshadowed by subsequent developments out of Heideggerian and Husserlian orientations. Nevertheless, his detailed analyses of various phenomena, such as willing and attitudes (Gesinnungen), have been undeservedly ignored. Moreover, his development of the concept of an "understanding psychology" also merits attention, which has not received its due to its treatment in a work with an unfashionable title (The Soul of Man (1933)).

Works
 Phänomenologie des Wollens: Eine psychologische Analyse (1900)
 Logik (1921) English translation: Logic Frankfurt, Ontos Verlag, 2009.
 Die Seele des Menschen (1933).

External links
 
'Pfänder, Alexander (1871–1941)', Encyclopedia of Philosophy

German philosophers
1870 births
1941 deaths
People from Iserlohn
German male writers
Burials at the Westfriedhof (Munich)